Sharanagati Gadyam is a Sanskrit prayer, written by the Hindu philosopher Ramanuja towards the end of the 11th century. It is one of the first bhakti prayers in the Sri Vaishnava school of thought and is the basis for many prayers, like the Raghuveera gadyam, also of this style. It is recited in the 108 Divya Desam temples, including Srirangam.

Composition
According to Sri Vaishnava tradition, Ramanuja and his disciples once visited the Ranganatha temple in Srirangam on panguni uttiram, a day in the Tamil calendar month of panguni (in spring) on the day of the ascension of the star called Uttiram. According to this tradition, the star Uttiram was in ascent when the goddess of the temple, Sri Ranganayaki Tayar, (Lakshmi) was born, and also the day she married the god Ranganatha (Vishnu). Ramanuja is regarded to have been inspired by the festivities of the day and subsequently composed the Sriranga Gadyam, Sharanagati Gadyam, and the Vaikuntha Gadyam.

Content
Sharanagati Gadyam, unlike the commentaries of Ramanuja on Vedanta, does not have detailed philosophical debates. Instead, it is a pure expression of bhakti and describes a transcendental conversation between Ramanuja and Narayana with Sri (also known as Lakshmi). He first describes the limitless kindness of Sri, and asks that she recommend him to Narayana, viewing the goddess as the accessible nature of God. Then, after her approval, he approaches Narayana and describes him as in the Sriranga Gadyam. He explains that he has committed many sins and is ignorant of philosophy and asks that he be accepted into the list of devotees of Narayana. He only asks that he be blessed so he becomes a supreme devotee, never forgetting to serve Narayana. Pleased by his humility and his total surrender, Sri and Narayana bless him for his single act of surrender, removing his karma and offering him moksha.

Style
The prayer is in prose, with alternating long and short sentences and many adjectival phrases.

References

Mantras
Hindu mantras
Sri Vaishnavism